Mirasadulla Miralasgar oglu Mirgasimov (1883–1958) was an Azerbaijani and Soviet surgeon and scientist. He was one of the founders and the first president of Azerbaijan National Academy of Sciences (1945-1947).

Biography 
Mir Asadulla Mir Alesker oglu Mirkasimov was born on November 17, 1883, in the city of Baku.

In 1913 he was enrolled in the Novorossiysk Medical School (Odesa I. I. Mechnikov National University).

In 1927 he became a doctor of medical science, in 1929 he was professor, and in 1945 he became the academician of the Azerbaijan SSR and was the first president (1945-1947). He was one of the founders of the Azerbaijan University of Medicine and Academy of Sciences.

Mirasadulla Miralasgar oglu Mirgasimov, a talented surgeon, the leading figure in Azerbaijani medicine, died in 1958.

Main scientific activity 

During his 45-year medical and scientific-research activity, Professor M.M.Mirgasimov published two monographs: “The Materials on the study of kidney stones in Azerbaijan”, “Surgery of typhoid fever” (in two volumes) and a textbook on general surgery in the Azerbaijani language, as well as more than 90 scientific articles.

Family

Awards and orders 

 “Order of the Red Banner of Labour”
 “Order of the Red Star”
 “For the defence of the Caucasus”
 “For valiant work in the Great Patriotic War”
 “For the Victory over Germany in the Great Patriotic War 1941–1945”

References

Surgeons from the Russian Empire
Soviet surgeons
1883 births
1958 deaths
20th-century surgeons
Odesa University alumni
Members of the Supreme Soviet of the Azerbaijan Soviet Socialist Republic
First convocation members of the Supreme Soviet of the Soviet Union
Second convocation members of the Supreme Soviet of the Soviet Union
Third convocation members of the Supreme Soviet of the Soviet Union